This is a list of Scottish Liberal Democrats MSPs. It includes all Members of the Scottish Parliament (MSPs) who represented the Scottish Liberal Democrats (aka "Lib Dems") in the Scottish Parliament.

List of MSPs

Notes

References

External links
 Current and previous Members of the Scottish Parliament (MSPs), on the Scottish Parliament website
 Scottish Liberal Democrats

List
Liberal Democrats